Belthangady Assembly constituency is one of the 224 Vidhan Sabha (Legislative Assembly) constituencies of Karnataka state in southwestern India.

Overview
Belthangady (constituency number 200) is one of the eight Assembly constituencies located in Dakshina Kannada district. It covers the same area as the Belthangady Taluk.

Belthangady is part of the Dakshina Kannada Lok Sabha constituency, along with seven other Vidhan Sabha segments, namely: 201. Moodabidri, 202. Mangalore City North, 203. Mangalore City South, 204. Mangalore, 205. Bantval, 206. Puttur and 207.
Sullia (SC).

Members of Legislative Assembly
The contest for the Belthangady legislative seat has been a thirty year contest between the Gowda family and the Bangera family, as well as one between the two Bangera brothers, Vasantha and Prabhakara.

Notes

Dakshina Kannada district
Assembly constituencies of Karnataka